Syngrapha microgamma, the little bride looper moth, is a moth of the family Noctuidae. The species was first described by Jacob Hübner in 1823. It is found in much of Canada south in the east to southern Maine, northern New York, and the Great Lakes states. In Europe, it is found from Fennoscandia and central Europe east to mountains eastern Asia.

Adults are on wing from May to July depending on the location. There is one generation per year.

The larvae feed on Ledum groenlandicum, Betula nana, Salix repens, Vaccinium uliginosum and Ledum palustre.

Subspecies
Syngrapha microgamma microgamma (Fennoscandia, Baltia, Poland, north European Russia, central Asia (mountains), Kamchatka)
Syngrapha microgamma nearctica (Labrador, Quebec to Yukon, Michigan, Wisconsin, Alberta, British Columbia, Colorado)

External links
Species info

Species info

Plusiinae
Moths of North America
Moths of Europe
Moths of Asia
Moths described in 1823